The Sortland Bridge is a cantilever road bridge that crosses the Sortlandssundet strait between the village of Strand on Hinnøya island and the town of Sortland on Langøya island. It is located within Sortland Municipality in Nordland county, Norway. The bridge has 21 spans.

The Sortland Bridge was opened in 1975. It was one of four bridges that were built in the 1970s to connect the islands of Vesterålen to each other. The other bridges that were built during that period are the Hadsel Bridge, Andøy Bridge and Kvalsaukan Bridge. Together with the Tjeldsund Bridge near Harstad, these bridges connect the islands of Vesterålen to the mainland. The Sortland Bridge was a toll bridge for many years after its opening.  Before the bridge was built, a ferry carried passengers across the strait. The ferry crossing was one of the busiest in Norway.

See also
List of bridges in Norway
List of bridges in Norway by length
List of bridges
List of bridges by length

References

Sortland
Bridges completed in 1975
Road bridges in Nordland
Former toll bridges in Norway
1975 establishments in Norway